Danny Verbeek (born 15 August 1990) is a Dutch professional footballer who plays as a attacking midfielder for Den Bosch in the Dutch Eerste Divisie. He formerly played for De Graafschap, Standard Liège and NAC Breda.

Career 
Verbeek was born in Den Bosch, and started his career with FC Den Bosch for whom he played 88 matches. In the summer of 2012 he was signed by Standard Liège. On 16 August 2012, Verbeek was sent on loan to NAC Breda after it became clear that his chances of playing in the Standard first team were limited. He would stay two seasons for the club. On 17 June 2014, Verbeek was sent on loan again, this time to FC Utrecht.

On 2 June 2022, Verbeek returned to Den Bosch on a two-year contract.

References

External links
 

1990 births
Living people
Sportspeople from 's-Hertogenbosch
Footballers from North Brabant
Association football wingers
Dutch footballers
FC Den Bosch players
Standard Liège players
NAC Breda players
FC Utrecht players
De Graafschap players
Eredivisie players
Eerste Divisie players
Dutch expatriate footballers
Expatriate footballers in Belgium
Dutch expatriate sportspeople in Belgium